The 2018 Men's Oceania Youth Handball Championship is to be held at the L'Arene du Sud, New Caledonia between 10 - 15 June 2018.

This is the first championship since 2011. The competition participants were defending champions New Zealand, Australia, Cook Islands, Fiji, hosts New Caledonia and Papua New Guinea.

New Zealand successfully defended their title, beating out New Caledonia for first place. Third was Australia followed by Fiji, Papua New Guinea and The Cook Islands.

Results

Rankings

References

 La Nouvelle-Zélande domine les Cagous chez les U18 La Nouvelles Calledoniennes (French)
 https://www.lnc.nc/article/sports/aux-oceania-les-cagous-aurontla-revanche-dans-la-peau La Nouvelles Calledoniennes (French)
 Faire le lien entre l’ancienne et la nouvelle génération La Nouvelles Calledoniennes (French)
 Critical for the development of handball in our region. IHF webpage. 26 June 2018.
 Strong Hornsby contingent in Australian Youth team contesting for Oceania Challenge Trophy. Hornsby Advocate. June 12, 2018
 The Arc News. University of New South Wales web page. Retrieved 26 Dec 2019

Oceania Youth Handball Championship